The Liquid Propulsion Systems Centre (LPSC) is a research and development centre functioning under Indian Space Research Organisation (ISRO). It has two units located at Valiamala, in Thiruvananthapuram of Kerala, and Bengaluru of Karnataka. LPSC is augmented by ISRO Propulsion Complex at Mahendragiri of Tamil Nadu.

LPSC is engaged in development of liquid and cryogenic propulsion stages for launch vehicles and auxiliary propulsion systems for both launch vehicles and satellites.  Activities related to liquid propulsion stages, cryogenic propulsion stages and control systems for launch vehicles and spacecraft is done at Thiruvananthapuram. Precision fabrication facilities, development of transducers and integration of satellite propulsion systems are carried out at Bangalore. The developmental and flight tests along with assembly and integration are done at ISRO Propulsion Complex, Mahendragiri in Tamil Nadu.

The development of liquid propellant stages for PSLV, control systems for SLV-3, ASLV, PSLV and GSLV, satellite propulsion systems including those for INSAT and IRS and production of pressure transducers are done by the LPSC for India. The LPSC has developed indigenous cryogenic upper stage for Geosynchronous Satellite Launch Vehicle (GSLV) which was successfully test fired by ISRO on 4 August 2007.

LPSC's current director is Dr. V Narayanan. He succeeded Mr. S Somnath in January, 2018 after which Shri S Somnath was appointed as Director of VSSC.

LPSC Trivandrum
This unit serves as LPSC headquarters, and is involved in research and development of Earth-storable and cryogenic propulsion for launch vehicles. It delivers engines, stages, associated control systems and components for launch vehicle and spacecraft.

The main activities carried out at Valiamala include:
Research and Development in earth storable and cryogenic propulsion systems for Launch Vehicle and Spacecraft applications
System design and architecture
Management of system projects
Management of earth storable and cryogenic engine and stage systems
Integration of launch vehicle propulsion control system packages and modules
Low thrust thruster test facilities for satellite thrusters

LPSC Bangalore
This unit caters predominantly to propulsion requirements of satellite programmes of ISRO apart from development of indigenous sensors and transducers. The activities that are carried out here include:
Design and realisation of monopropellant thrusters and components
Integration of spacecraft propulsion systems
Development and production of transducers
Management of launch vehicle stage tanks and structures at industries

IPRC Mahendragiri

On 1 February 2014, this unit was renamed as  Indian Space Research Organisation (ISRO) Propulsion Complex and was also made an autonomous department under ISRO.  The Mahendragiri unit was previously functioning under LPSC in Valiamala. The main activities carried out at here are:
Assembly and integration of liquid engines and stages
Testing of liquid engines and stages
High altitude test facilities for upper stage engines
Propellant storage facilities

See also
Indian Space Research Organisation
Vikram Sarabhai Space Centre
Satish Dhawan Space Centre
Indian Institute of Space Science and Technology

References

Indian Space Research Organisation
Rocket engine manufacturers of India
Research institutes in Thiruvananthapuram
Year of establishment missing